This is a complete list of Zeppelins constructed by the German Zeppelin companies from 1900 until 1938. Other rigid airships that are also sometimes referred to as zeppelins but not built by Zeppelin are not included.

The Zeppelin company based in Friedrichshafen, Germany, numbered their aircraft LZ 1/2/ ..., with LZ standing for "Luftschiff [airship] Zeppelin". Additionally, craft used for civilian purposes were named, whereas military airships were usually given "tactical numbers":

 The Deutsches Heer called its first Zeppelins Z I/II/ ... /XI/XII. During World War I they switched to using LZ numbers, later adding 30 to obscure the total production.
 The Kaiserliche Marine's Zeppelins were labelled L 1/2/ ....

Since 1997, airships of the new type Zeppelin NT have been flying. They are not included here, as they are not rigid airships and do not represent a continuity of design from the ones listed here.

Zeppelins finished before World War I

Zeppelins constructed during World War I
Usage: military

{| class="wikitable"
|-
! Production number
! Class
! Tactical numbering
! First flight
! Remarks
! Fate
! Image
|- valign=top
| LZ 26
| N
| Z XII
| 14 December1914
|Decommissioned 8 August 1917.
|
|- valign=top
| LZ 27
| M
| L 4
| 18 August1914
| Flew 11 reconnaissance missions over the North Sea, participated in the first raid over England on 20 January 1915. Forced landing in Blavandshuk on 17 February 1915 during a storm; 11 crew interned, with four members lost when the airship subsequently blew out to sea.
| Crashed North Sea 17 February 1915
|
|- valign=top
| LZ 28
| M
| L 5
| 22 September1914
| Flew 47 reconnaissance missions over the North Sea and Baltic; proved especially useful in discovering enemy mines. Two attack missions, dropping  bombs. Damaged beyond repair by Russian air defences on 7 August 1915.
| Shot down Eastern front 7 August 1915
|
|- valign=top
| LZ 29
| M
| Z X
| 13 October1914
| Two attacks on Calais and Paris, dropping  of bombs; on the way back Z X was damaged by enemy fire and dismantled after a forced landing at Saint-Quentin.
| Crashed in St. Quentin, France
|
|- valign=top
| LZ 30
| M
| Z XI
| 15 November1914
| Used for raids on Warsaw, Grodno and other targets on the Eastern front. 
| Destroyed in an accident Eastern front on 20 May 1915
| 
|- valign=top
| LZ 31
| M
| L 6
| 3 November1914
| Took part in the German defence during the Cuxhaven Raid on 25 December 1914, unsuccessfully attacking ; 36 reconnaissance missions around North Sea, including marking mine fields; one raid on England, dropping  of bombs. Caught fire during inflation in its hangar at Fuhlsbüttel and destroyed with LZ 36 on 16 September 1916.
| Destroyed in hangar on 16 September 1916
| 
|- valign=top
| LZ 32
| M
| L 7
| 20 November1914
| Flew 77 reconnaissance missions over the North Sea, with several unsuccessful attempts to attack English coastal towns.
| Destroyed by Sub in North Sea 4 May 1916
|
|- valign=top
| LZ 33
| M
| L 8
| 17 December1914
| Used for reconnaissance missions along the western front. Brought down by anti-aircraft fire at Tienen, Belgium on 5 March 1915. All 21 crew were killed.
| Destroyed at Tienen, Belgium on 5 March 1915
|
|- valign=top
| LZ 34
| M
| LZ 34
| 6 January1915
| Carried out two raids on the eastern front, dropping  of bombs. Heavily damaged by enemy fire on 21 June 1915 and burnt near Insterburg.
| Burnt near Insterburg on 21 June 1915
|
|- valign=top
| LZ 35
| M
| LZ 35
| 11 January1915
| Two raids on Paris and Poperinghe (Belgium), dropping  of bombs; enemy fire forced in down near Aeltre (Belgium), then destroyed by a storm.
| Destroyed by a storm near Aeltre, Belgium 13 April 1915
|- valign=top
| 
| O
| L 9
| 8 March1915
| 74 reconnaissance missions in the North Sea; four raids on England dropping  of bombs; attacked several British submarines. Burnt out in its hangar on 16 September 1916 together with LZ 31.
| Burnt in hangar on 16 September 1916
| 
|- valign=top
| LZ 37
| M
| LZ 37
| 4 March1915
| Based at Gontrode, shot down by Flt Sub-Lt R Warneford, 1 Sqdn RNAS, flying a Morane-Saulnier Type L, during its first raid on Calais on 7 June 1915 and crashing at Sint-Amandsberg, near Ghent. Warneford was awarded a VC for his actions.
| Shot down near Ghent, Belgium 7 June 1915
|
|- valign=top
| LZ 38
|P
| LZ 38
| 3 April1915
| Joined the first bombing raid on London on 31 May 1915, killing 7 people and injuring 35 while causing £18,596 damage, five successful raids on Ipswich, Ramsgate, Southend (twice) and London, dropping  of bombs.  Destroyed by British bombers in its hangar at Evere on 7 June 1915.
| Burnt in hangar at Evere 7 June 1915
|
|- valign=top
| LZ 39
| O
| LZ 39
| 24 April1915
| Extensively damaged on 17 May 1915 by Flt Commander BigsworthThree raids on the western and two on the eastern front, dropping  of bombs. On 17 December 1915, captained by Dr. Lempertz, LZ 39 was hit by shrapnel during an attack on Rovno. All rear gas cells were punctured and the front engine car was hit and later fell off. The crew abandoned the now-overstressed control cabin, dropped ballast and shifted loads to rebalance the ship and used an emergency control station in the rear to limp back to Germany. Upon forced landing the ship collapsed because material for repair and the supply of gas needed to refill the cells were not available.
| Abandoned 1915 in Germany
|
|- valign=top
| LZ 40
| P
| L 10
| 13 May1915
| 8 reconnaissance missions around the North Sea; 5 attacks on England dropping  of bombs. Destroyed in a thunderstorm on 3 September 1915 near Cuxhaven killing 19 crew members.
| Destroyed in a storm in Germany on 3 September 1915
|
|- valign=top
| LZ 41
| P
| L 11
| 7 June1915
| 31 reconnaissance missions, notably during the Battle of Jutland; 12 raids on England dropping  of bombs. Significant raid on Sunderland on 1 April 1916, when 22 people died.
|Decommissioned in April 1917
| 
|- valign=top
| LZ 42
| P
| LZ 72
| 15 June1915
| Training ship, due to poor quality metal used.
| Decommissioned February 1917
|
|- valign=top
| LZ 43
| P
| L 12
| 21 June1915
| 5 reconnaissance missions; came down in the English Channel from damage by A.A. fire after bombing Dover. Towed to Ostend on 10 August 1915 but burnt during salvage operation.
| Burnt in Ostend, Belgium 10 August 1915
|
|- valign=top
| LZ 44
| P
| LZ 74
| 8 July1915
| Two attacks on England dropping  of bombs; wrecked when it flew into a mountain in the Schnee Eifel on 8 October 1915.
| Crashed into a Schnee Eifel mountain, Germany on 8 October 1915
|
|- valign=top
| LZ 45
| P
| L 13
| 23 July1915
| 45 reconnaissance missions, including one in which it played a significant part in the action of 19 August 1916; 15 attacks on England dropping  of bombs; decommissioned on 25 April 1917
| Decommissioned on 25 April 1917
|
|- valign=top
| LZ 46
| P
| L 14
| 9 August1915
| Most successful German Navy airship; 42 reconnaissance missions; 17 attacks on Britain dropping  of bombs; taken out of service during 1917 and 1918. 
| Destroyed by its crew on 23 June 1919.
|
|- valign=top
| LZ 47
| P
| LZ 77
| 24 August1915
| 6 attacks on England and France dropping  of bombs. Destroyed by enemy fire on 21 February 1916 in the Battle of Verdun, killing the crew of 15. Reports at the time indicated LZ 77 had searchlights, eight machine guns, two so-called 'revolver' guns in the top lookout post, was accompanied by fixed-wing aircraft and at least one other Zeppelin and had orders to bomb nearby railway lines.
|Destroyed in the Battle of Verdun 21 February 1916
|
|- valign=top
| LZ 48
| P
| L 15
| 9 September1915
| 8 reconnaissance missions; 3 attacks on England dropping  of bombs. Damaged by ground fire from Dartford AA battery during a raid on London on 1 April 1916, it came down at Kentish Knock Deep in the Thames estuary. 1 crew member was killed, the other 17 were taken prisoner.
| Shot down Thames estuary 1 April 1916
|
|- valign=top
| LZ 49
| P
| LZ 79
| 2 August1915
| Dropped  of bombs in two attacks on Brest-Litovsk and Kovel and one attack on Paris on 30 January 1916; hit by French fire and damaged beyond repair in forced landing near Ath, Belgium.
| Crashed Ath, Belgium on 30 January 1916
| 
|- valign=top
| LZ 50
| P
| L 16
| 23 September1915
| 44 reconnaissance missions; 12 attacks on England dropping  of bombs; delivered supplies to German isles in winter 1916. Damaged beyond repair during a training mission at Nordholz Naval Airbase on 19 October 1917.
| Destroyed in Germany on 19 October 1917
| 
|- valign=top
| LZ 51
| P
| LZ 81
| 7 October1915
| Used at the South-Eastern and the Western Front; transported a diplomatic commission to Sofia on 9 November 1915; one attack on Étaples (France) and two attacks on Bucharest, dropping  of bombs; brought down by ground fire near Turnovo (Bulgaria) on 27 September 1916.
| Crashed near Turnovo (Bulgaria) on 27 September 1916
|
|- valign=top
| LZ 52
| P
| L 18
| 3 November1915
| 
| Destroyed in shed fire at Tondern during refuelling on 17 November 1915
| 
|- valign=top
| LZ 53
| P
| L 17
| 20 October1915
| 27 reconnaissance missions; nine attacks on England dropping  bombs. Destroyed in its hangar at Tondern on 28 December 1916 when LZ 69 caught fire.
| Destroyed in hangar at Tondern on 28 December 1916
| 
|- valign=top
| LZ 54
| P
| L 19
| 27 November1915
| Raided England on 31 January 1916, dropping  of bombs. On 2 February 1916 after a raid on England with three engines failing, it came under Dutch fire and sank in the North Sea, drowning all crew members as nearby English fishing trawler King Stephen refused any help to them. In the last hours Kapitan-Leutnant Loewe and his crew dropped into the sea their last messages, which washed up six months later in Sweden. On 23 April 1916 Torpedo boat G41 attacked and sank the King Stephen, taking its crew prisoner.
| Shot down in North Sea 23 April 1916
| 
|- valign=top
| LZ 55
| P
| LZ 85
| 12 September1915
| 6 attacks dropping  of bombs on Dünaburg (Latvia), Minsk, the railroads of Riga, and Saloniki (twice); damaged by fire from the battleship  on 5 May 1916, it came down in the Vardar marshes. The crew of 12 were captured.
| Shot down Vardar, Greece on 5 May 1916
| 
|- valign=top
| LZ 56
| P
| LZ 86
| 10 October1915
| 7 attacks dropping  of bombs along the Eastern and South-Eastern front; crashed on 5 September 1916 at Temesvar, killing nine of the crew.
| Crashed near Temesvar, Austria-Hungary on 5 September 1916 
| 

|- valign=top
| LZ 57
| P
| LZ 87
| 6 December1915
| 2 attacks on Ramsgate and Margate dropping  of bombs; in July 1916 handed to the German Navy; 16 reconnaissance missions around the Baltic Sea; later used as a school ship.
| Decommissioned in July 1917
|
|- valign=top
| LZ 58
| P
| LZ 88
| 14 November1915
| 14 reconnaissance missions; 3 attacks dropping  of bombs along the Western Front; in January 1917 handed to the German Navy who used it for experimental purposes. 
| Decommissioned in September 1917.
| 
|- valign=top
| LZ 59
|Q
| L 20
| 21 November1915
| 6 reconnaissance missions; 2 attacks on England dropping  bombs; ran out of fuel after raiding Scotland on 3 May 1916, drifted and stranded near Stavanger (Norway). The crew destroyed the airship. 16 were captured, 3 died. Kapitänleutnant Stabbert escaped six months later.
| Crashed Stavanger, Norway on 3 May 1916
| 
|- valign=top
| LZ 60
| P
| LZ 90
| 1 January1916
| 4 attacks on Bar-le-Duc, Norwich, London and Étaples, dropping  of bombs; on 7 November 1916 broke loose in a storm and blown out to sea and was never seen again.
| Crashed in North Sea on 7 November 1916
|
|- valign=top
| LZ 61
| Q
| L 21
| 10 January1916
| 17 reconnaissance missions; 10 attacks on England dropping  of bombs. Intercepted and destroyed by Flight–Lieutenant Egbert Cadbury, flying BE 2C, No. 8265, Flight Sub–Lieutenant Gerard William Reginald Fane, flying RAF BE 2C No. 8421 and Flight Sub–Lieutenant Edward Laston Pulling, flying BE 2C, No. 8626, firing phosphor rounds. L 21 caught fire and fell into the sea about eight miles east of Lowestoft on 28 November 1916. There were no survivors.
| Crashed in North Sea on 28 November 1916
| 
|- valign=top
| LZ 62
| R
| L 30
| 28 May1916
| First of the Type R "Super-Zeppelin" class, it had a volume of 55,200 m3. Ten raids on England dropping  of bombs; 31 reconnaissance missions above the North and Baltic Seas and at the Eastern Front; retired on 17 November 1917 and laid up at Seerappen. In 1920 ordered to be transferred to Belgium as part of war reparations, where it was dismantled. Some components, including an engine car, are preserved at the Royal Army and Military History Museum, Brussels.
| Transferred to Belgium after war
|
|- valign=top
| LZ 63
| P
| LZ 93
| 23 February1916
| Three attacks on Dunkirk, Mardick and Harwich, dropping  bombs. 
| Decommissioned in 1917.
|
|- valign=top
| LZ 64
| Q
| L 22
| 3 March1916
| Thirty reconnaissance missions; 8 attacks on Britain, dropping  of bombs; destroyed by RNAS Curtis H12 flying boat flown by Flight Commander Robert Leckie (later Air Vice Marshal) near Terschelling on 14 May 1917 during a reconnaissance mission. (Leckie was also credited in the downing of LZ 112)
| Shot down near Holland on 14 May 1917
|
|- valign=top
| LZ 65
| Q
| LZ 95
| 1 February1916
| Destroyed by French anti-aircraft fire on 21 February 1916 during an attempted attack on Vitry-le-François.
| Shot down over France on 21 February 1916
|
|- valign=top
| LZ 66
| Q
| L 23
| 8 April1916
| 51 reconnaissance missions; 3 attacks on England dropping  of bombs; captured Norwegian ship "Royal" in the North Sea on 23 April 1917. Destroyed on 21 August 1917 by 2nd Lt Bernard A. Smart flying a Sopwith Pup launched from a platform on the cruiser . Smart later led the Tondern raid which destroyed LZ 99 & LZ 108.
| Shot down over North Sea on 21 August 1917
| 
|- valign=top
| LZ 67
| Q
| LZ 97
| 4 April1916
| Four attacks on London (twice), Boulogne and, later, Bucharest, dropping  of bombs, plus several unsuccessful flights due to bad weather. 
| Decommissioned on 5 July 1917.
|
|- valign=top
| LZ 68
| Q
| LZ 98
| 28 April1916
| One attack on London dropping  bombs, plus several flights aborted due to bad weather; handed to the German Navy in November 1916; 15 reconnaissance missions around the Baltic Sea. 
| Decommissioned in August 1917.
|
|- valign=top
| LZ 69
| Q
| L 24
| 20 May1916
| 19 reconnaissance missions around the North Sea; 4 raids on England dropping  f bombs; crashed into a wall while being taken into its hangar on 28 December 1916 and burned out together with LZ 53.
| Burned in hangar 
|
|- valign=top
| LZ 70
| style="text-align:center;" colspan="4"| Not built
| 
|
|- valign=top
| LZ 71
| Q
| LZ 101
| 29 June1916
| Stationed in Yambol (Bulgaria); 7 attacks dropping  of bombs on Bucharest, Ciulnița, Fetești, Galați, Odessa, Mytilene, Iași and Mudros. 
| Dismantled in September 1917.
|
|- valign=top
| LZ 72
| R
| L 31
| 12 July1916
| One reconnaissance mission in fleet operation against Sunderland; 6 attacks on England dropping  of bombs; with LZ 74, LZ 76 and LZ 78 as part of Zeppelin raid on night of 23 September 1916; intercepted and destroyed by British fighter pilot Lt. W. Tempest on 2 October 1916 near Potters Bar, north of London, while commanded by the leading airship commander of the time, Kapitän Leutnant Heinrich Mathy, who died with his entire crew after jumping from the burning Zeppelin. The crew were buried at Potters Bar but were later exhumed and reburied at Cannock Chase.
| Shot down near London on 2 October 1916
|
|- valign=top
| LZ 73
| Q
| LZ 103
| 23 August1916
| One successful attack on Calais dropping  of bombs (other attacks cancelled or aborted due to poor weather)
| Decommissioned in August 1917
|
|- valign=top
| LZ 74
| R
| L 32
| 4 August1916
|Three attacks on England dropping of bombs; commanded by Kapitan-Leutnant Werner Petersen, with LZ 72, LZ 76 and LZ 78 part of Zeppelin raid on the night of 23 September 1916; destroyed by 2nd Lt Frederick Sowrey, of 39 Home Defence Squadron, in a Royal Aircraft Factory BE.2C on 24 September 1916 near Great Burstead, Essex, all the crew dying.<ref name="Essex Police">Martin Lockwood, Somewhere Over Essex</ref> The crew's bodies were buried at Great Burstead, then exhumed in 1966 and reburied at Cannock Chase.
| Shot down in Essex on 24 September 1916 
| 
|- valign=top
| LZ 75
| R
| L 37
| 9 November1916
| 17 reconnaissance missions around the North and Baltic Sea and England; 4 raids dropping  of bombs; retired on 24 December 1917 
| Transferred to Japan in 1920
|
|- valign=top
| LZ 76
| R
| L 33
| 30 August1916
|  Part of the Zeppelin group that bombed London and surrounding counties (L 31, L 32, L 33 and L 34) on the night of 23 September 1916; during its first mission, in which 3200 kg bombs had been dropped, after an anti-aircraft shell seriously damaged it, commander Kapitan-Leutnant Alois Bocker turned over Essex and was attacked by 39 Home Defence Squadron night fighters from Hainault Farm and hit several times (credit for disabling given to B.E.2c No. 4544 piloted by Alfred de Bathe Brandon), but even after dropping guns and equipment Bocker decided it would not make it back across the North Sea, forced landing in Little Wigborough, Essex 24 September 1916 with no fatalities, the crew were only partly successful in burning the hull, and British engineers examined the skeleton and later used the plans as a basis for the construction of airships R33 and R34, itself the first-ever east–west trans-Atlantic aircraft of any type.
| Shot down in Essex on 24 September 1916
|  
|- valign=top
| LZ 77
| Q
| LZ 107
| 16 October1916
| One attack on Boulogne, France, dropping  of bombs (several other raids being cancelled or aborted). 
| Decommissioned in July 1917.
|
|- valign=top
| LZ 78
| R
| L 34
| 22 September1916
| Three reconnaissance missions; two attacks on England dropping  of bombs; took part in the Zeppelin raid which also involved the L 31, L 32 and L 33 on the night of 23 September 1916, and was the only Zeppelin that survived the raid; intercepted and destroyed by British fighter pilot 2nd Lt Ian Pyott in BE2c no. 2738 off Hartlepool on 27 November 1916.
| Shot down near Hartlepool on 27 November 1916.
|
|- valign=top
| LZ 79
| R
| L 41
| 15 January1917
| 15 reconnaissance missions around the North Sea; four attacks on England dropping of bombs; used as a school ship from 11 December 1917. 
| Destroyed in Germany on 23 June 1919.
|
|- valign=top
| LZ 80
| R
| L 35
| 20 October1916
| 13 reconnaissance missions around the North and Baltic Sea; three attacks on England dropping  of bombs
| Decommissioned in September 1918.
|
|- valign=top
| LZ 81
| Q
| LZ 111
| 20 December1916
| Not used in the German Army and transferred to Navy in May 1917; 7 reconnaissance missions around the Baltic Sea
| Decommissioned on 10 August 1917.
|
|- valign=top
| LZ 82
| R
| L 36
| 1 November1916
| 20 flights around the North Sea and England, including four reconnaissance missions; damaged during landing in fog at Rehben-an-der-Aller on 7 February 1917 and decommissioned.
| Decommissioned in Germany on 7 February 1917 
|
|- valign=top
| LZ 83
| R
| LZ 113
| 22 February1917
| 15 reconnaissance missions around the Eastern Front and the Baltic Sea; three attacks dropping  of bombs. 
| Transferred to France as part of war reparations in 1920
|
|- valign=top
| LZ 84
| R
| L 38
| 22 November1916
| Damaged beyond repair in a forced landing (due to heavy snowfall) during an attempted raid on Reval and Saint Petersburg on 29 December 1916
| Destroyed in Saint Petersburg on 29 December 1916
|
|- valign=top
| LZ 85
| R
| L 45
| 12 April1917
|  12 reconnaissance missions around the North Sea; 3 attacks on England dropping  of bombs. Ran out of fuel on 20 October 1917 and destroyed in forced landing near Sisteron, France, the crew being taken captive.
| Crashed near Sisteron, France, on 20 October 1917
| 
|- valign=top
| LZ 86
| R
| L 39
| 11 December1916
| Two reconnaissance missions around the North Sea; one attack on England dropping 300 kg bombs, and on return destroyed by French flak near Compiègne on 17 March 1917.
| Shot down near Compiègne on 17 March 1917
| 
|- valign=top
| LZ 87
| R
| L 47
| 11 May1917
| 18 reconnaissance missions and three attacks dropping  of bombs around the North Sea and England.
| Burned in German hangar on 5 January 1918
|
|- valign=top
| LZ 88
| R
| L 40
| 3 January1917
| 7 reconnaissance missions; 2 attacks on England, dropping  of bombs. Damaged beyond repair while landing on 16 June 1917 in Nordholz.
| Crashed in Nordholz, Germany on 16 June 1917
|- valign=top
| LZ 89
| R
| L 50
| 9 June1917
| 5 reconnaissance missions around the North Sea; two attacks on England dropping  of bombs. Ran out of fuel on 20 October 1917 and, after the control car had been torn off as a result of an attempt to crash the airship to prevent it falling into enemy hands near Danmartin, it was blown over the Mediterranean with five crew members still on board.
| Crashed in the Mediterranean on 20 October 1917
| 
|- valign=top
| LZ 90
| R
| LZ 120
| 31 January1917
| 17 reconnaissance missions and 3 attacks dropping  of bombs around the Eastern Front and the Baltic Sea. Retired on 8 October 1917; in 1920 ordered to be transferred to Italy as war reparations, where it broke apart one year later while gas was removed.
|  Transferred to Italy in 1920
|
|- valign=top
| LZ 91
| S
| L 42
| 21 February1917
| First of the Height-Climber S class, which had a lightened structure to improve maximum altitude. 20 reconnaissance missions; 4 attacks on England dropping  of bombs; used as a school ship from 6 June 1918. 
| Destroyed by its crew on 23 June 1919.
|
|- valign=top
| LZ 92
| S
| L 43
| 6 March1917
| 6 reconnaissance missions; one attack on English docks, dropping  of bombs. Shot down by British fighter aircraft on 14 June 1917 during reconnaissance mission. Attacked HMAS Sydney on 4 May 1917.
| Shot down off Vlieland, Holland on 14 Jun 1917
| 
|- valign=top
| LZ 93
| T
| L 44
| 1 April1917
| 8 reconnaissance missions; 4 attacks on England and Royal Navy units. Driven south to France by a heavy storm, it was shot down over Lunéville on 20 October 1917.
| Shot down over Lunéville, France on 20 October 1917
|
|- valign=top
| LZ 94
| T
| L 46
| 24 April1917
| 19 reconnaissance missions around the North Sea; 3 raids on England dropping  of bombs. Destroyed in the Ahlhorn explosion.
| Burned in hangar Ahlhorn, Germany on the 5 January 1918
|
|- valign=top
| LZ 95
| U
| L 48
| 22 May1917
| One successful reconnaissance mission. Joined attempted attack on London with 3 others, became lost and was intercepted and destroyed by British fighters over water near Great Yarmouth on 17 June 1917 and crashing near Theberton, Suffolk, a village near the town of Leiston. Three survivors; crew buried at Theberton,www.theberton.info later to be exhumed and reburied at Cannock Chase.
| Shot down near Great Yarmouth on 17 June 1917
| 
|- valign=top
| LZ 96
| U
| L 49
| 13 June1917
| Two reconnaissance missions around the North Sea; one raid on England dropping  of bombs; while returning, forced to land near Bourbonne-les-Bains on 20 October 1917 and captured almost undamaged by French forces.
| Crashed near Bourbonne-les-Bains, France on 20 October 1917
|
|- valign=top
| LZ 97
| U
| L 51
| 6 June1917
| 3 reconnaissance missions; one raid on the English coast, dropping 280 kg bombs. Destroyed in the Ahlhorn explosion.
| Burned in hangar Ahlhorn, Germany on the 5 January 1918
|
|- valign=top
| LZ 98
| U
| L 52
| 14 July1917
| 20 reconnaissance missions; accidentally taken above London by an unexpected storm during a raid, it dropped  of bombs there. 
| Destroyed by its crew on 23 June 1919.
|
|- valign=top
| LZ 99
| U
| L 54
| 13 August1917
| 14 reconnaissance missions; two attacks on England dropping  of bombs; destroyed together with LZ 108 when seven RNAS Sopwith Camel fighters, launched from the aircraft carrier , bombed the Toska hangar at Tønder, German Empire (Now part of Denmark). (Only two fighters returned to the Furious, though three of the others landed in Denmark after running low on fuel.)
| Burned in hangar Tondern, Germany on 19 July 1918
|
|- valign=top
| LZ 100
| V
| L 53
| 8 August1917
| 19 reconnaissance missions; 4 attacks on England, dropping  of bombs. Intercepted and destroyed by a Sopwith Camel flown by Lt Culley RAF, who took off from a lighter towed by the destroyer , on 11 August 1918. LZ 100 was the last zeppelin destroyed in the war.
| Shot down in North Sea on 11 August 1918
|
|- valign=top
| LZ 101
| V
| L 55
| 1 September1917
| Two attacks dropping  of bombs.
| Crashed on 19 October 1917
|
|- valign=top
| LZ 102
| W
| L 57
| 26 September1917
| Not used in combat. Intended for use in Africa. Damaged beyond repair by heavy wind on 8 October 1917.
| Destroyed in a storm on 8 October 1917. 
| 
|- valign=top
| LZ 103
| V
| L 56
| 24 September1917
| 17 reconnaissance missions; participated in the last raid on England on 6 August 1918. 
| Destroyed by its crew on 23 June 1919.
|
|- valign=top
| LZ 104
| W
| L 59
| 30 October1917
| Known as the Afrika-Schiff, stationed in Yambol (Bulgaria); LZ 104 started out on a resupply mission to German East Africa. However, British forces had advanced to the designated landing zone, forcing the German admiralty to abort the mission and recall the ship while west of Khartoum. Nevertheless, LZ 104 set a long-distance flight record of ( in 95 hours and 5 minutes) or nearly 4 days in the air. The ship met its end on 7 April 1918 when it crashed into the waters of the Strait of Otranto with the loss of all 21 crew.
| Crashed in sea, Strait of Otranto, Italy on 7 April 1918
| 
|- valign=top
| LZ 105
| V
| L 58
| 29 October1917
| Two reconnaissance missions; destroyed in the Ahlhorn explosion.
| Burned in hangar Ahlhorn, Germany on 5 January 1918
|
|- valign=top
| LZ 106
| V
| L 61
| 12 December1917
| 9 reconnaissance missions; two attacks on England dropping  of bombs; in 1920 ordered to be transferred to Italy as war reparations.
| Transferred to Italy in 1920
|
|- valign=top
| LZ 107
| V
| L 62
| 19 January1918
| Two reconnaissance missions; two attacks on England dropping  of bombs; on the raid on 12/13 April 1918 her gunners managed to damage and drive away an attacking airplane, the only known instance of this happening. Crashed north of Helgoland on 10 May 1918: shot down by Felixstowe F2A flying-boat N4291, flown by Capt T.C. Pattinson and Capt T.H. Munday.
| Shot down in Northsea on 10 May 1918
|
|- valign=top
| LZ 108
| V
| L 60
| 18 December1917
| 11 reconnaissance missions; one attack on England dropping 3,120 kg of bombs; destroyed together with LZ 99 when seven RNAS Sopwith Camel fighters, launched from the aircraft carrier , bombed the Toska hangar at Tønder, German Empire (Now part of Denmark).
| Shot down in Tondern raid on 19 July 1918
| 
|- valign=top
| LZ 109
| V
| L 64
| 11 March1918
| 13 reconnaissance missions over the North Sea; with LZ 108, LZ 106, LZ 107, and LZ 110 raided north of England dropping 2800 kg in bombs. In 1920 transferred to Britain as war reparations. Scrapped at short notice when hangar required for the damaged R36.
| Transferred to Britain in 1920
|
|- valign=top
| LZ 110
| V
| L 63
| 4 March1918
| Dropped  of bombs in three attacks on England, including participation in the last raid on England on 6 August 1918. 
| Destroyed by its crew on 23 June 1919.
|
|- valign=top
| LZ 111
| V
| L 65
| 17 April1918
| Participated in last raid on England on 6 August 1918. 
| Destroyed by its crew on 23 June 1919.
|
|- valign=top
| LZ 112
| X
| L 70
| 1 July1918
| Directed last raid on England on 6 August 1918, with KK Peter Strasser, Commander of the Navy Airship Department on board; intercepted and destroyed over North Sea by British de Havilland DH-4 flown by Major Egbert Cadbury with Captain Robert Leckie (later Air Vice-Marshal) as gunner. These men had already shot down two Zeppelins: prior to L 70, Cadbury had downed L 21 and Leckie, L 22.
| Destroyed over North Sea on 6 August 1918
|
|- valign=top
| LZ 113
| X
| L 71
| 29 July1918
| Not used in war; in 1920 transferred to Great Britain as war reparations. Scrapped at short notice when hangar required for the damaged R36.
| Scrapped after war
||
|- valign=top
|  LZ 114
| X
| L 72Dixmude| 9 February1920
| Delivery cancelled when war ended; transferred to France as war reparations on 9 July 1920 and named Dixmude. Made record duration flight of 118 hours. Exploded off the coast of Sicily during a thunderstorm on 21 December 1923 following a lightning strike, killing all aboard.
| Exploded off the coast of Sicily during a thunderstorm on 21 December 1923
|
|- valign="top"
| LZ 115
| style="text-align:center;" colspan="6"| Not realizedOrdered in July 1918 as experimental airship L 100; project continued as LZ 119
|- valign="top"
| LZ 116
| style="text-align:center;" colspan="6"| Not finished|- valign=top
| LZ 117
| style="text-align:center;" colspan="6"| Not finished|- valign=top
| LZ 118
| style="text-align:center;" colspan="6"| Never ordered|- valign=top
| LZ 119
Construction planned for June 1919, but cancelled on 6 October 1918.
|}

September 1917 group photo shows Navy Zeppelin captains: Manger (L 41), von Freudenreich (L 47), Schwonder (L 50), Prölss (L 53), Bockholt (L 57), Peter Strasser (FdL – Führer der Luftschiffe), Gayer (L 49), Stabbert (L 44), Ehrlich (L 35), Dietrich (L 42), Hollender (L 46), Dose (L 51) and Friemel (L 52).

Zeppelins constructed after World War I

 See also 

 List of Parseval airships
 List of Schütte-Lanz airships
 List of airships of the United States Navy
 Rigid airship

 Notes 

 References 

 
 Bruce, J.M. The Sopwith Pup: Historic Military Aircraft No 6. Flight. 1 January 1954. p. 8-12.
 
 
   

 
  (Word document) from The Last Flight of the L48, linked from Theberton and Eastbridge Parish Council History.
 Robinson, Douglas H. Giants in the Sky. Henley-on-Thames: Foulis, 1973. 
 Robinson, Douglas H. The Zeppelin in Combat'' (3rd ed). Henley-on-Thames: Foulis, 1971.

External links 

Airships.net Detailed information and photographs (interior and exterior), primarily about commercial Zeppelins
eZEP.de — The webportal for Zeppelin mail and airship memorabilia
 silhoeuttes of important Zeppelins from 1900 to 1919, Lueger 1904–1920, shows LZ: 1,3,5,6,8,10,13,14,18,21,23,25,26,36,40,59,62,91,94,95,100,104,113,120
 Important airship types, Lueger 1904–1920, Table 1 lists data on selected Zeppelins
fengatesroad.com story of L21's last flight
Luftschiffe in Tondern – illustrated list of Zeppelins stationed at Tønder
LZ 3 Photographs by Franz Stoedtner: perspective; cross-section and front elevation; exiting the hangar
LZ 4 Photographs by Franz Stoedtner: Z4 climbing; view of empennage over the water
LZ 10 Photographs by Franz Stoedtner: over the Havel river
 Z IV crew showing their Iron Crosses
 This photograph on 19 March 1918 shows 32 crew with Kapitänleutnant Friemel. Selected L 52 crew photographs: Flieger und Luftschiffer - Quirin Gerstl, Flieger und Luftschiffer - Quirin Gerstl, Flieger und Luftschiffer - Quirin Gerstl, Flieger und Luftschiffer - Quirin Gerstl and Flieger und Luftschiffer - Quirin Gerstl.
(Luftschifferalltag Christmas celebration table under the LZ 81 in its hangar)

Lists of airships
List
Lists of aircraft by manufacturer
1900s German aircraft
1910s German aircraft
1920s German aircraft
1930s German aircraft